Since October 2022, Russia has conducted multiple waves of missile and drone strikes on infrastructure as part of its invasion of Ukraine. The strikes target civilian areas beyond the battlefield and critical energy infrastructure in particular, which is considered a war crime.

On 9 October 2022, Russian missile strikes targeted infrastructure in Zaporizhzhia city. The following day, a wave of missile and drone strikes targeted cities throughout Ukraine, including the capital Kyiv. Further waves periodically hit Ukrainian infrastructure, killing and injuring many, and seriously affecting energy distribution across Ukraine and neighboring countries. By 23 November, nearly half of the country's energy systems had been destroyed and half of Ukrainian civilians were without electricity or heating. By mid-December, Russia had fired more than 1,000 missiles and drones at Ukraine's energy grid.

The WHO said that deliberately depriving Ukrainians of electricity and heating during the cold winter months was the biggest attack on a nation's health since World War II. The attacks on power stations inflicted large economic and practical costs on Ukraine. The strikes were assumed to be part of Russia's 'Strategic Operation for the Destruction of Critically Important Targets' (SODCIT) military doctrine, aimed at demoralizing the population and forcing the Ukrainian leadership to capitulate. This is widely deemed to have failed.

The strikes were condemned internationally, with the European Commission describing them as "barbaric" and NATO Secretary General Jens Stoltenberg calling them "horrific and indiscriminate". President Zelenskyy described the strikes as "absolute evil" and "terrorism".

Background 

In the early weeks of the war, aside of purely military fronts, plagued by poor assessments, preparations and blunders, Russia had bombed both information infrastructure and fuel facilities. Late February 2022 the Russian Ministry of Defence assured that its troops were not targeting Ukrainian cities, but that its actions were limited to surgically striking and incapacitating Ukrainian military infrastructure. The ministry claimed that there were no threats whatsoever to the civilian population. For months thereafter, Russia continued to hit Ukrainian infrastructure such as railways, fuel depots and bridges, in order to hinder the delivery of weapons to the front lines. Those disruption efforts were mitigated via restoration of services and decentralised alternatives such as Starlink statellite internet services.

On October 6, the Ukrainian military reported that 86 Shahed 136 kamikaze drones had been launched by Russian forces in total, and between September 30 and October 6 Ukrainian forces had destroyed 24 out of 46 launched in that period.

According to the Ukrainian Main Directorate of Intelligence, Russian troops received orders from the Kremlin to prepare for massive missile strikes on Ukraine's civilian infrastructure on 2 and 3 October. On 8 October, the Crimean Bridge explosion shook a key symbol and military logistic line between Russia and Southern military fronts.  Russia vowed to respond.

2022

9 October  

Around 13 people were killed and 89 injured during missiles stirkes launched at a residential area in Zaporizhzhia, destroying an apartment building and damaging 70 other buildings.

10 October 

Starting on 10 October, 11 important infrastructure facilities in 8 regions including the city of Kyiv were damaged as a result of the strikes. Ukraine's Minister of Energy German Galushchenko stated around 30% of the energy infrastructure in Ukraine had been hit by the missile attacks. Ukrenergo reported that power supply interruptions in some cities and towns of the country.

Russian missiles hit at least 14 regions of which the most intense were in Kyiv. Explosions were reported in Lviv, Ternopil and Zhytomyr in Western Ukraine; Kyiv, Dnipro and Kremenchuk in Central Ukraine; Zaporizhzhia in Southern Ukraine; and Kharkiv in Eastern Ukraine. The missiles targeted at key energy infrastructure and military command facilities, but missiles also hit civilian areas, including a university and a children's playground in Kyiv.

Mayor of Kyiv Vitali Klitschko stated that several explosions occurred in Shevchenkivskyi and Solomianskyi District. Advisor head of the Ministry of Internal Affairs Anton Herashchenko, stated that one of the attacks held near the Monument to Mykhailo Hrushevsky. Around 8:18 local time, a missile struck at the Kyiv Glass Bridge.

Explosions damaged the building and the roof of the Kyiv central station, but the station continued its operation.

The subway trains stopped running and the underground tunnels of the Kyiv Metro became shelters for citizens.

The strikes damaged Ukrainian cultural and educational buildings, including the Taras Shevchenko National University of Kyiv, the Khanenko Museum, Taras Shevchenko National Museum and several other museums.

In the city of Zaporizhzhia, an apartment block was destroyed and a kindergarten was damaged.

As a result of rocket strikes on Lviv's energy facilities, the city went into a blackout. Hot water also stopped running in apartment buildings.

On the morning of 10 October, three strikes were recorded on Kharkiv energy infrastructure facilities. In some areas, water and electricity were cut off.

In the centre of Dnipro city the bodies of people killed at an industrial site on the city's outskirts were found, with windows in the area blown out and glass littered in the street.

Strikes were carried out in Khmelnytskyi and Zhytomyr, as well as in Ivano-Frankivsk, Ternopil, Sumy, and Poltava regions. Electricity and water supplies were disrupted in Poltava, and there were blackouts in the region.

11–31 October 

On 11 October, the Kyiv Metro's red line and the interchange node at Teatralna–Golden Gate was closed. Most stations continued to operate as bomb shelters. The same day, 7 people were killed and 49 injured in Kyiv. Areas struck by missiles included a nearby children's playground. Fires broke out in six cars, and more than 15 cars were damaged. 4 civilians were killed in Kyiv on 17 October due to a drone strike. Five people were reported killed and eight were injured in the Zaporizhzhia region.

On 14 October, Samsung Electronics confirmed that its Ukrainian branch office suffered minor damages. A missile exploded near the office at 101 Tower in Lva Tolstoho street and there were no signs of casualties.

Russian missile damaged the Germany consulate at Kyiv, although no casualties were reported since the building was vacant.

On 18 October, attacks on Ukrainian infrastructure were carried out which lead to blackouts around 1,162 towns and villages. President Zelensky stated that 30% of Ukraine power stations had destroyed.

On 22 October, Russia launched a series of strikes on targeting the energy infrastructure. Ukraine's air force command stated 18 of 33 cruise missiles were shot down. Ukrenergo stated "the scale of the damage is comparable or may exceed the consequences of the attack on October 10–12". The missile strikes cut off electricity for 1.5 million Ukrainians.

On 27 October, missile strikes reduced the country's energy capacity further, with the effect of extending the blackout periods in Kyiv, Zhytomyr and Chensky, and northern Chernihiv regions.

On 31 October, a mass missile strike hit Ukraine's electrical infrastructure, leaving around 80% of Kyiv residents without running water.

November 

On 15 November 2022, President Zelenskyy stated that around 70 of 100 missiles and 10 drones targeting Ukraine's critical infrastructure had been shot down by Ukraine air defence system. Tu-95 and Tu-160 launched Kh-101 and Kh-555 missiles from the Caspian and the Rostov Oblast regions. 3M-54 Kalibr missiles were launched from the Black Sea.

On 17 November, Russia launched a series of missile strikes targeting Ukraine gas production facilities and PA Pivdenmash missile plant. Explosions were heard in Kyiv, Odesa, Zaporizhzhia and Kharkiv.

On 23 November, Ukrainian armed forces reported that around 51 of 70 missiles were intercepted by air defences. Kyiv’s mayor Vitali Klitschko stated around 21 out of 31 missiles launched to Kyiv were shot down. Missiles targeted civilian infrastructure including apartment blocks, hospitals, and energy infrastructure which led to at least 6 people killed, one of the missiles struck the hospital's maternity ward at Vilniansk killing a newborn baby.

Attacks on the connection of the European grid caused more than half of Moldova to lose power.

December 
On 5 December, Ukraine Prime Minister Shmyhal stated that Russian missiles attacked Energy facilities in Kyiv, Vinnystia and Odesa regions which led to cut off the water supply in Odesa. Mykolaiv suffered power outages affected the surrounding region. Zaporizhzhia missiles attack killed at least two people and injured three others including a child.

On 10 December, 7 of the 24 Ukrainian oblasts were attacked by Shahed kamikaze drones which led to Odesa's electricity grid damaged and around 1.5 million residents were without electricity. Despite Power restoration, around 300,000 people were without electricity.

On 16 December, Russia launched more than 70 missiles targeting Ukrainian infrastructure. Three people were killed in Kryvyi Rih after one missile struck an apartment block.  Ukraine's energy minister German Galushchenko stated that nine power generating facilities had been attacked causing energy shortages. The Kyiv metro was also shut down.

Around 2:00 am local time on 19 December, Russian self-detonating drones attacked Kyiv and other Ukrainian cities targeting Ukraine critical infrastructure. Electricity grid operator Ukrenergo reported that despite the interception of Ukraine Air defense there were several hits at infrastructure.

On 29 December, Ukrainian armed forces claimed 54 of 69 Russian missiles were intercepted, including 16 over Kyiv and 21 over Odesa. At least 3 civilians were wounded in Kyiv, and a civilian house was struck in Darnyts'kyi.

On 31 December, Russia launched missile strikes on Ukraine which killed one and injured at least a dozen, including a foreign journalist. Ukrainian Army chief Valerii Zaluzhnyi claimed 12 of the 20 missiles were intercepted by air defence and caused damage to a hotel and an isolated house in Kyiv. Ukrainian officials denounced the targeting of residential quarters. The strikes had less impact on national energy system, yet 30% of Kyiv was without electricity.

2023

January 
On 1 January 2023, Russian missile and drone strikes damaged infrastructure in Sumy, Khmelnytskyi, Zaprorizhzhia and Kherson. At least two people were killed in the attacks.

On 14 January, Russian missiles hit critical infrastructure in Kyiv but no casualties were reported. A second wave came hours later when two S-300 missiles struck critical energy infrastructure in Kharkiv.

In Dnipro a multi-storey residential building was struck by a KH-22 cruise missile, causing part of the building to collapse. There was a large number of reported injuries and fatalities, which rose over the duration of the rescue operation. The search and rescue operation were called off on 17 January. The final death toll was put at 46.

On 26 January, a day after Ukraine secured agreement with the US and Germany to supply battle tanks, Russia launched an overnight drone attack followed by a number of missile strikes targeting infrastructure. Commander in chief, Valery Zaluzhny confirmed that a 55 year old man had been killed and two were injured at missile attack in Kyiv. He also said that 47 out of 55 missiles had been shot down. Ukrainian energy company DTEK announced that Electrical substations conducted emergency power shutdowns and critical energy infrastructure in Odesa and Vinnytsia regions were hit. Kyiv's Mayor Vitali Klitschko stated that death toll rose to around 11 people and 35 buildings were damaged across 11 regions.

February 
On 2 February, a Russian missile hit an apartment building at Kramatorsk city in Eastern Ukraine. Police stated that around 3 people died and 21 wounded due to the attack.

On 10 February, Ukraine's air force commander stated that 61 of the 71 missiles launched were shot down, which included cruise, ballistic, and S-300 missiles. Ukrenergo said high-voltage facilities had been hit in all parts of Ukraine, causing disruption to power supplies. Mostly launched from the Black Sea, this attack was seen as a probing of Ukrainian air defences via its southern side in preparation for a future offensive.

On 11 February, Russian forces launched a wave of Iranian-made Shahed drones targeting critical Ukrainian targets.

On 16 February, Ukrainian Armed forces stated that 16 of 41 missiles launched by Russian forces were shot down. Strikes included the use of Kh-22 anti-ship missiles that Ukraine cannot intercept, and some targets hit were in Lviv Oblast, and Pavlohrad.

March 
On 9 March, Russia attacked with an estimated 81 elements, 34 missiles were shot down, a lower than usual rate due to Russia shift to new technologies.  Russia claimed it carried out a "massive retaliatory strike" as payback after a raid in the Bryansk Oblast of Russia. Russia's attack included an unprecedented six Kinzhal hypersonic missiles.  Kyiv, Odesa and Kharkiv regions were all hit leaving 40% of civilians in Kyiv without heat and electricity outages in Odesa.  At least five people were killed by the strikes in Zolochiv, Lviv region, one civilian died in Dnipro region, and three were killed by artillery in Kherson. The attack again damaged electricity supplies to Zaporizhzhia nuclear power plant forcing it onto emergency diesel generators. Rafael Grossi, head of the IAEA said "Each time we are rolling a dice. And if we allow this to continue time after time then one day our luck will run out".

Spillover

Moldova 

Nicu Popescu, the Minister of Foreign Affairs and European Integration of Moldova, announced that three Russian missiles launched on 10 October from the Black Sea aimed at Ukraine crossed through Moldovan airspace. He condemned this event in the "strongest possible terms" and called it a breach of international law. Popescu also added that the Russian ambassador to Moldova, Oleg Vasnetsov, had been summoned to provide explanations.

On 31 October, a Russian missile, shot down by Ukrainian air defence systems, crashed into Naslavcea, a village in Moldova. No casualties were reported but windows of several residential houses were shattered. Moldovan authorities strongly condemned the renewed wave of attacks.

On 5 December, a missile once again fell into Moldovan territory. The Ministry of Internal Affairs of Moldova announced that it was found by the Moldovan Border Police in an orchard close to the city of Briceni. Due to this, patrolling intensified and the alert level was raised in the areas of Briceni and Ocnița. Russian military expert Alexei Leonkov said that this event was similar to the one that had occurred in Poland previously and that in both cases it was a missile originating from a S-300 missile system.

On 14 January, Moldovan border police found missile debris in Larga, Briceni District. Specialists carried out "controlled detonations" of the debris. Moldova also said that its airspace was crossed once more during the 14 January attacks.

On 10 February, Moldova reported that its airspace had again been violated by a Russian missile.

Poland 

On 15 November, a missile struck the territory of Poland at the village of Przewodów near the border with Ukraine, killing two civilians at a grain dryer. At least 50 missiles were in the air at the time. According to a spokesman for the Ukrainian Air Force, out of 20 Russian missiles, 15 were shot down and 5 hit their target. Ukraine fires two interceptor missiles at each incoming Russian missile. The spokesman, Yuriy Ignat, said during an interview: "so we can assume at least 30 missiles were launched from our side." This was the first time a missile hit NATO territory during the Russian invasion of Ukraine. The missile was determined to have likely been launched by Ukraine as part of their air-defense system in response to ongoing missile strikes, although an investigation by Poland and NATO is ongoing.

Belarus 
Following the wave of missile strikes on 29 December, it was reported that a Ukrainian S-300 air defence missile was shot down by Belarusian authorities after it strayed into Belarus. It crashed near the village of Harbacha. Both sides acknowledged the incident as an accident.

Reactions

International organizations

United Nations 
UN Secretary General António Guterres was "deeply shocked" by the large-scale missile attacks, his spokesman said.

European Union 
Ursula von der Leyen, the president of the European Commission, promised the European Union would stand alongside Ukraine for as "long as it takes", speaking in a video message alongside the Prime Minister of Estonia, Kaja Kallas, near the EU's eastern border with Russia. France's President Macron announced on 12 October that air defence systems would be delivered to Ukraine in the coming weeks because of the strikes. He said the war had entered "an unprecedented stage". Germany announced, 10 October it would speed up delivery of four of its IRIS-T SLM air defence system. The Netherlands Defence Minister, Kajsa Ollongren wrote in a letter to parliament 12 October, that the attacks "..can only be met with unrelenting support for Ukraine and its people." She announced €15 million in air defence missiles for Ukraine in response to the Russian attacks.

Following a German initiative, fifteen European countries announced, 13 October, that they would jointly procure air defence systems to protect the continent under the new European Sky Shield Initiative.

Following further attacks on Ukrainian energy infrastructure 23 November, The European Parliament voted in favour of designating Russia a state sponsor of terrorism.

NATO 
The NATO Secretary General, Jens Stoltenberg, said on 28 November that "Putin [is trying to use] winter as a weapon of war".

Individual states

United States 
The day after the strikes, President Joe Biden condemned the attacks and announced that Ukraine would be sent "advanced air defense systems". The US President had a phone call with the Ukrainian President Volodymyr Zelenskyy. President Biden "expressed his condemnation of Russia's missile strikes across Ukraine, including in Kyiv, and conveyed his condolences to the loved ones of those killed and injured in these senseless attacks. He pledged to continue providing Ukraine with the support needed to defend itself, including advanced air defense systems." The US Embassy urged its citizens to leave Ukraine due to shelling, which poses a direct threat to the civilian population and civilian infrastructure.

Three US officials speaking to media, 13 December, said plans were in their final stages to send Ukraine Patriot air defence systems. The system is the most advanced that the US has. Former Russian president Medvedev had made warnings about its potential deployment. The final decision to deploy the system was announced by the US administration on 20 December.

United Kingdom 
Britain condemned the strikes with Defence Secretary Ben Wallace saying, 13 October, that the UK would donate its advanced air defence system, AMRAAM which is capable of shooting down cruise missiles. He added that more aerial drones and a further 18 howitzer artillery guns would also be sent. The UK's Prime Minister, Rishi Sunak visited Kyiv on 19 November, announcing a further £50m package of defence aid including 125 anti-aircraft guns, radars and anti-drone technology. He also said he would be stepping up humanitarian aid. On 12 December, in the UK Parliament, former Prime Minister, Boris Johnson asked defence minister, Ben Wallace about supplying Ukraine with long range weapons. He replied mentioning Russia's breach of Geneva Conventions by targeting civilians, saying he would be "..open minded to see what we do next."

Ukraine 

Ukrainian President Volodymyr Zelenskyy wrote on Telegram: "They are trying to destroy us and wipe us off the face of the earth. The air raid sirens do not subside throughout Ukraine. There are missiles hitting. Unfortunately, there are dead and wounded."

The head of the Ministry of Foreign Affairs of Ukraine, Dmytro Kuleba, announced the immediate interruption of his African visits due to massive missile attacks. He said Vladimir Putin "is a terrorist who talks with missiles", whose "only tactic is terror on peaceful Ukrainian cities, but he will not break Ukraine down".

The Ministry of Education recommended that all schools be transferred to distance education by 14 October.

In a telephone conversation, Chancellor of Germany Olaf Scholz and Zelenskyy agreed to convene an emergency meeting of the G7.

Review shows more than 83 missiles and 17 Iranian-made Shahed UAVs, launched from the territory of Belarus, were involved in the strikes. Ukraine claimed that it had shot down 43 of the missiles, including a cruise missile that was shot down with MANPADS.

On 29 December 2022, following the strikes against Ukrainian infrastructure, Dmytro Kuleba tweeted, "There can be no ‘neutrality’ in the face of such mass war crimes. Pretending to be ‘neutral’ equals taking Russia’s side."

On 4 January 2023, Vadym Skibitsky, deputy head of Ukraine's military intelligence, stated that Russia was struggling to replenish its stockpiles of missiles and only has enough for two to three major barrages of 80 missiles or more.

Russia 

Russia's Ministry of Defence stated on 10 October that it was satisfied with the strikes on Ukraine and claimed that all the targets, including military and energy objects, had been destroyed.

On 10 October Russian President Vladimir Putin said the missile strikes on Ukraine were in retaliation for the alleged Ukrainian attack on the Crimean Bridge, which he called an act of "terrorism", adding that if such attacks continued, the response would be "severe".

Russian propagandists and government officials, such as Margarita Simonyan, Tigran Keosayan, Vladimir Solovyov, Evgeniy Poddubny and Ramzan Kadyrov, welcomed the missile strikes on Ukraine, with some calling to target power stations before winter. Russian state-owned television channel Russia-1 spread false claims that the Ukrainian president, Volodymyr Zelenskyy, fled Ukraine following the missile strikes. Russian pundits have also falsely claimed that the photos and videos of victims injured by shards of glass of a bombed high-rise building were staged.

Others 
  On October 11, crowds gathered in the cities of Melbourne, Sydney, Hobart, and the capital, Canberra, to rally in support of Ukraine following the strikes.
  Maia Sandu, President of Moldova, condemned the attacks on 10 October, stating that "brutality, terror and killing of innocent civilians must immediately stop".
  The Ministry of Foreign Affairs of China expressed "hope [that] the situation will de-escalate soon", a spokesperson said during a press briefing.
  Ministry of External Affairs of India issued a statement expressing deep concerns at "the latest escalation of conflict in Ukraine, including targeting of infrastructure and civilian deaths." They also called for an "immediate cessation of hostilities and urgent return to the path of diplomacy and dialogue."
  Yair Lapid, the Prime Minister of Israel, "strongly condemned" the Russian attacks on civilians.
  Turkish Foreign Minister Mevlüt Çavuşoğlu spoke over the phone with his Ukrainian counterpart. He strongly condemned the Russian strikes and affirmed that Turkey will continue its support for Ukraine. The ministers also coordinated efforts on mobilising a resolute response within the United Nations General Assembly.

Remedial actions

United Nations 
The UN launched an appeal through its Development Programme for the supply of power transformers, transformer substations, gas turbines and other critical items to Ukraine.  The Office for the coordination of Humanitarian Affairs announced the roll out of a $1.7 billion programme for Ukrainians to buy food and other basics, saying it was the "largest cash assistance programme in history".

European Parliament 
In addition to €1 billion humanitarian assistance package, the European Union's Civil Protection Mechanism provided 500 generators with 300 more funded by charities. Repair kits were also provided. On 23 November, as a joint initiative between the European Parliament and Eurocities, a campaign called "Generators of Hope" was launched. It called on 200 European cities to direct relief to Ukraine with the President of Eurocities and Mayor of Strasbourg, Dario Nardella saying "..We must act immediately. Winter is upon us [..] there is no time to waste".

Turkish floating powerships 
Turkey's Karpowership company was reported, 29 November as being in talks with Ukraine to provide up to three floating power generators. The ships, if they were provided, could provide up to 300 megawatts, enough for 1 million homes. Volodymyr Kudrytskyi, CEO of Ukrenergo, said that Russian missile attacks had caused "colossal" destruction and that practically no power stations in Ukraine had been left untouched. For reasons to do with insurance in the war zone, discussions were ongoing 8 December with the UN and other aid agencies, to position the ships in Romania or Moldova. Power lines that interconnect the countries to Ukraine would be used to supply up to 400MW of electrical power.
On 26 January 2023 Ukraine's JSC Energy Co. signed a Memorandum of Understanding with Karpowership to develop and finance the implementation of the project.

Light bulb appeal 
The damage to Ukraine's energy infrastructure had caused a shortfall of approximately 2.5 gigawatts of power according to president Zelenskyy, speaking in Paris, 14 December. Electrical generators, he said, were now "as necessary [..] as armoured vehicles and bulletproof vests". The supply of 50 million LED lightbulbs to Ukraine would save around one gigawatt, reducing the shortfall by 40%. The European Union pledged to supply 30 million light bulbs.

EBRD finance and Netherlands grant 
Two loans of €150 million were agreed by the European Bank for Reconstruction and Development to Ukrenergo for equipment and capital structure support. A further €70 million was provided in grant form by the Netherlands making a combined package of €370 million.

See also 

 Aerial bombardment and international law
 Attacks on civilians in the 2022 Russian invasion of Ukraine
 War crimes in the 2022 Russian invasion of Ukraine
 2022–2023 Moldovan energy crisis
 The Blitz
 Operation Rolling Thunder
 Gulf War air campaign

Notes

References

Airstrikes conducted by Russia
Airstrikes during the 2022 Russian invasion of Ukraine
Attacks on buildings and structures in Ukraine
Attacks on electrical infrastructure in Ukraine
War crimes during the 2022 Russian invasion of Ukraine
October 2022 events in Ukraine
November 2022 events in Ukraine
December 2022 events in Ukraine
Infrastructure in Ukraine
Moldova–Russia relations
Moldova–Ukraine relations
Poland–Russia relations
Poland–Ukraine relations
January 2023 events in Ukraine